Yuliya Fomenko (born 14 January 1981 in Azov, Rostov Oblast) is a retired female backstroke swimmer from Russia, who competed for her native country at the 2000 Olympic Games in Sydney, Australia. There she ended up in 10th place in the 4×200 m freestyle relay.

References
 sports-reference

1981 births
Living people
Russian female backstroke swimmers
Swimmers at the 2000 Summer Olympics
Olympic swimmers of Russia
European Aquatics Championships medalists in swimming
People from Azov
Sportspeople from Rostov Oblast